The House of Commons Standing Committee on  Human Resources, Skills and Social Development and the Status of Persons with Disabilities (HUMA) is a standing committee of the House of Commons of Canada.

Mandate
The mandate and management of Department of Human Resources and Skills Development Canada and its subsidiary agencies:
The Canada Industrial Relations Board
The Canadian Centre for Occupational Health and Safety
The Canadian Artists and Producers Professional Relations Tribunal
The Canada Mortgage and Housing Corporation
The study of topics relating to the Department, including:
Employment insurance
Employment benefits and support measures
Income security programs
The Canada Labour Code
Post-secondary education and training
Social programs for seniors, families, children and persons with disabilities
The study of recommendations to shorten the foreign qualification recognition process
Skills development in remote rural communities

Membership

Subcommittees
Subcommittee on Agenda and Procedure (SHUM)

References
Standing Committee on  Human Resources, Skills and Social Development and the Status of Persons with Disabilities (HUMA)

Human Resources
Disability in Canada